Accomack County Airport  is a county-owned public-use airport located  west of the central business district in Melfa, a town in Accomack County, Virginia, United States.

History
The airport was built by the United States Army Air Forces about 1942, and was known as Melfa Flight Strip.  It was an emergency landing airfield for military aircraft on training flights.    It was closed after World War II, and was turned over for local government use by the War Assets Administration (WAA).
Between April 1957 and October 1958 the north end of runway 21, which is now a displaced threshold section, was used for tests by the Naval Ordnance Laboratory.
These tests involved an Vought F7U Cutlass dropping simulated atomic anti-runway bombs, to test for penetration necessary for effectiveness.
The repairs to the displaced threshold, still visible on aerial photographs, are impacts from these tests.

Facilities and aircraft 
Accomack County Airport covers an area of 100 acres which contains one runway designated 3/21 with a 5,000 x 100 ft (1,524 x 30 m) asphalt surface. For the 12-month period ending September 30, 2009, the airport had 14,056 aircraft operations, an average of 38 per day: 84% general aviation and 8% air taxi and 9% military. At that time there were 23 aircraft based at this airport: 22 single-engine and 1 multi-engine.

References

 Shaw, Frederick J. (2004), Locating Air Force Base Sites History's Legacy, Air Force History and Museums Program, United States Air Force, Washington DC, 2004.

External links

Airports in Virginia
County airports in the United States
County government agencies in Virginia
Buildings and structures in Accomack County, Virginia
Flight Strips of the United States Army Air Forces
Airfields of the United States Army Air Forces in Virginia
Transportation in Accomack County, Virginia
Airports established in 1942
1942 establishments in Virginia